SPO may refer to:

Politics
 Serbian Renewal Movement (Srpski pokret obnove), a political party in Serbia
 Socialist Party of Ontario, Canada
 Strengthening Participatory Organization, a rights-based organization in Pakistan
 SPÖ, Social Democratic Party of Austria
 Party of Civic Rights, political party in the Czech Republic

Technology
 Secondary phosphine oxide, a class of organophosphorus compounds
 SharePoint Online

Other
 Saint Paul's Outreach, a Catholic missionary organization
 SPO:), a Lithuanian sports magazine
 SPO Rouen Basket, a basketball club in Rouen, France
 Scholarly Publishing Office, University of Michigan University Library
 Seoul Philharmonic Orchestra, a South Korean orchestra based in Seoul
 Strong Pareto optimum, in economics 
 Supreme Prosecutors' Office of the Republic of Korea
 Erik Spoelstra, head coach of the Miami Heat

See also
 Spo11, a protein used in a complex along with Mre11 and Rad50 during meiotic recombination
 SPOC (disambiguation)